東山, meaning "eastern mountain(s)", may refer to:

Mandarin Chinese reading Dōngshān (also in simplified characters 东山):
Dongshan County, Zhangzhou, Fujian, People's Republic of China
Dongshan Island, location of the Chinese Civil War Battle of Dongshan Island
Dongshan District, Guangzhou, Guangdong, People's Republic of China
Dongshan District, Hegang, Heilongjiang, People's Republic of China
Dongshan District, Jieyang, Guangdong, People's Republic of China
Dongshan District, Tainan, Taiwan, Republic of China
Dongshan District, Urumqi, Xinjiang, People's Republic of China
Shi Dongshan (1902–1955), Chinese film director

Cantonese Chinese reading Dūngsāan:
Tung Shan (mountain), mountain in Hong Kong
Yi Tung Shan, mountain in Hong Kong
Sunset Peak (大東山), mountain in Hong Kong
Tung Shan Mansion, building in Ko Shan Terrace, Taikoo Shing, Hong Kong

Korean reading Dongsan:
Pen name of South Korean politician Yun Chi-Young
Dongsan Station, Deokjin-gu, Jeonju, Jeollabuk-do, South Korea

Japanese on-yomi Tōsan or kun-yomi Higashiyama, as a placename:
Higashiyama-chō, Chikusa-ku, Nagoya, Japan
Higashiyama, Iwate, former town in Iwate, Japan
Higashiyama-ku, Kyoto, Japan
Higashiyama period
Higashiyama Line, Nagoya Municipal Subway System, Japan
Higashiyama Station (Kyoto), Japan
Higashiyama Station (Hokkaidō), Japan
Higashiyama Station (Nara), Japan
Tōsandō, old Japanese geographical region
Tōkai–Tōsan dialect

Japanese kun-yomi Higashiyama, as a name:
Emperor Higashiyama (1675–1710), 113th Emperor of Japan
Kaii Higashiyama (1908–1999), 20th-century Japanese artist.
Noriyuki Higashiyama, member of J-pop group Shonentai